Nemrik 9 is an early Neolithic archeological site in the Dohuk Governorate in the north of modern-day Iraq.

Numerous rounded buildings were found along with evidence of communal courtyards. Buildings featured post holes and benches with walls that were made of mudbrick and plastered with clay. Several graves were found containing anything from skull fragments to full skeletons. Stone tools found at the site included pestles, mortars, quern-stones, grinders, axes and polishing stones. Some rare examples of worked stone were discovered including one piece made from marble. Some decorative adornments were also found, including beads, pendants, shell and bone ornaments. Some stone and clay art objects were recovered in the shapes of heads and animals, these included a series of sixteen bird heads.

Faunal analysis was carried out by A. Lasota-Moskalewska and found relatively few remains from domestic sheep, goats, pigs and cattle. Other bones found included various antelope, jackal, deer, boar, badger, and horse. Some snail shells were found that were also considered to be a food source. There was also evidence of panther and Indian buffalo. Plant remains at the site were floated by Mark Nesbitt and indicated evidence for bitter vetch, pea and lentil, the domestication of which was not determined. The site was well situated between the two terrain types of grassy steppe and forest and is considered of key importance for research into village structures in the Pre-Pottery Neolithic A stage.

References

External links
 www.exoriente.org - Radiocarbon dates for Nemrik 9
 University of Cologne - Radiocarbon Context Database entry for Nemrik 9
 Nemrik - the PCMA UW site

1985 archaeological discoveries
Archaeological sites in Iraq
Former populated places in Iraq
Neolithic settlements
Khiamian sites
Dohuk Governorate
Pre-Pottery Neolithic A